Goshen High School is a public high school in Goshen, Ohio, United States.  It is the only high school in the Goshen Local School District.

Athletics
Goshen's athletic teams, known as the Warriors, participated in the Fort Ancient Valley Conference from 1986 to 2004. The school is now a member of the Southern Buckeye Athletic/Academic Conference's American Division, which they were also a part of from 1928 to 1985.

Ohio High School Athletic Association State Championships
 Boys' baseball: 1958
 Wrestling: 1979, 2011, 2012 (Individual State Champions)

Conference Championships

 Football: 1957, 1959, 1961, 1964, 1976, 1983, 1984, 1985, 1986, 1987, 1988, 1989, 1990, 1994, 2007, 2009, 2017
 Girls' soccer: 2006, 2007
 Boys' cross country: 1974, 1975, 1976, 1989, 2005
 Boys' basketball: 1980, 1984, 1986, 1994, 2007, 2011
 Girls' basketball: 1973, 1981, 1982, 1988, 1989, 1990, 2000, 2006, 2015
 Academics: 1987, 2005, 2009
 Baseball: 1958, 1959, 1961, 1964, 1967, 1979, 2015
 Boys' tennis: 1987
 Girls' tennis
 Boys' track: 1956, 1956, 1957, 1958, 1959, 1960, 1961, 1962, 1968, 1977, 1980, 1981, 1984, 1985, 1991, 2006
 Girls' track: 1970, 2006 
 Wrestling: 1986

Notable alumni
 Sam Leever, former MLB player, Pittsburgh Pirates, 4-time 20-game winner, National League ERA leader, played in first World Series in 1903.
 Bill Faul, former MLB player 6 seasons (Detroit Tigers, Chicago Cubs, San Francisco Giants)

External links
 District website

Notes and references

High schools in Clermont County, Ohio
Public high schools in Ohio